Taylor Peak may refer to

 Mountains in the USA:
Taylor Peak (Alaska) 
Taylor Peak (California)
Taylor Peak (Grand County, Colorado)
Taylor Peak (Gunnison County, Colorado) 
Taylor Peak (Idaho) 
Taylor Peaks (Madison County, Montana) 
Taylor Peak (Judith Basin County, Montana) 
Taylor Peak (Lincoln County, Montana) 
Taylor Peak (White Pine County, Nevada)  
Taylor Peak (Lea County, New Mexico) 
Taylor Peak (Sierra County, New Mexico)

See also
Taylor Mountain (disambiguation)